Tanir Rural LLG is a local government area in New Ireland Province, Papua New Guinea. The LLG administers the Tanga Islands and the Feni Islands. Tanir is a portmanteau word from the two island names which are Tanga and Anir.

The current LLG president is Felix Kaltubim from Tanga Islands. Population is 12,466(Tanga Islands is 9,033, Feni/Anir Islands is 3,433) as per 2011 Papua New Guinea Census Report. Two languages spoken here, split from Tangga language with the Niwer Mil language spoken on Tanga Islands and Warwar Feni language spoken on Feni Islands.

Wards
01. Taonsip
02. Fonli
03. Kamunaseo
04. Amfar
05. Sungkin
06. Put
07. Nonu
08. Lif
09. Tefa
10. Natong
11. Basakala
12. Balankolen
13. Kamgot
14. Balangit

References

 Foster, Robert J., Social Reproduction and History in Melanesia: Mortuary Ritual, Gift Exchange and Custom in the Tanga Islands. Cambridge: Cambridge University Press, 1995
  Hammarström, Harald; Forkel, Robert; Haspelmath, Martin; Bank, Sebastian, eds. (2016). "Tangga". Glottolog 2.7. Jena: Max Planck Institute for the Science of Human History.
Niwer Mil (Tangga Island) at Ethnologue (18th ed., 2015)
Warwar Feni (Feni Island) at Ethnologue (18th ed., 2015)

Local-level governments of New Ireland Province